Nicolas Leboissetier (born 5 June 1971) is a former French racing driver.

See also
Auto racing
Motorsport
Outline of auto racing

References

1971 births
Living people
French racing drivers
International Formula 3000 drivers
24 Hours of Le Mans drivers
Place of birth missing (living people)
20th-century French people